Michael Brown, (born 27 February 1985) is an English professional footballer who played for Preston North End and made 18 appearances in The Football League during a loan spell with Chester City. After suffering from illness for 18 months, Brown returned to football at Lancaster City before moving to Fleetwood Town. He is currently unattached.

Notes

References
Michael Brown

1985 births
English footballers
Living people
Preston North End F.C. players
Chester City F.C. players
Lancaster City F.C. players
Fleetwood Town F.C. players
English Football League players
Association football midfielders
Footballers from Preston, Lancashire